
Year 887 (DCCCLXXXVII) was a common year starting on Sunday (link will display the full calendar) of the Julian calendar.

Events 
 By place 

 Europe 
 November 17 – East Frankish magnates revolt against the inept emperor Charles III (the Fat) in an assembly at Frankfurt, and depose him. His nephew Arnulf of Carinthia, the illegitimate son of former king Carloman of Bavaria, is elected ruler of the East Frankish Kingdom. Charles yields his throne without a struggle, and retires to Neidingen. 
 December 26 – In an assembly at Pavia (Northern Italy), the lords of Lombardia elect Berengar I, a grandson of former emperor Louis the Pious (through his daughter Gisela), as king of Italy. He is crowned with the Iron Crown of Lombardy. After the deposition of Charles the Fat, the nobility chooses Ranulf II as duke (or 'king') of Aquitaine.

 Japan 
 August 26 – Emperor Kōkō abdicates the throne and soon dies, after a 3-year reign. He is succeeded by his 20-year-old son Uda, as the 59th emperor of Japan.

 Al-Andalus 
 The city of Toledo rises against the Umayyad Dynasty, in Al-Andalus (modern Spain).

By topic
Religion
 February 5 – Theodosius Romanus ascends as Syriac Orthodox patriarch of Antioch.

Births 
 Frederuna, queen of the West Frankish Kingdom (d. 917)
 Qian Yuanguan, king of Wuyue (Ten Kingdoms) (d. 941)
 Song Qiqiu, chief strategist of Southern Tang (d. 959)

Deaths 
 January 11 – Boso of Provence, Frankish nobleman
 April 6 – Pei Che, chancellor of the Tang Dynasty
 July 6 – Wang Chongrong, Chinese warlord
 August 26 – Kōkō, emperor of Japan (b. 830)
 September 18 – Pietro I Candiano, doge of Venice
 September 24 – Gao Pian, general of the Tang Dynasty
 Abbas ibn Firnas, Muslim physician and inventor (b. 810)
 Ibn Majah, Muslim hadith compiler (or 889)
 Jeonggang, king of Silla (modern Korea) 
 Xiao Gou, chancellor of the Tang Dynasty
 Yantou Quanhuo, Chinese Chan master (b. 828)
 Zheng Changtu, chancellor of the Tang Dynasty
 Zhu Mei, Chinese warlord (approximate date)

References